Prem Sagar Patel is an Indian politician and a member of 17th Legislative Assembly of Pipra Babu, Uttar Pradesh of India. He represents the Siswa (Assembly constituency) of Uttar Pradesh and is a member of the Bharatiya Janata Party.

Political career
Patel has been a member of the 17th Legislative Assembly of [[UP]. Since 2017, he has represented the Siswa (Assembly constituency) and is a member of the BJP.

Posts held

See also
Uttar Pradesh Legislative Assembly

References

Uttar Pradesh MLAs 2017–2022
Bharatiya Janata Party politicians from Uttar Pradesh
Living people
Year of birth missing (living people)
Uttar Pradesh MLAs 2022–2027